Radio Songs: A Best of Cold Chsiel is the second greatest hits collection by Australian pub rock band Cold Chisel, and first compilation released in Australia. The album was released in 1985.
It included tracks from their first five studio albums, Cold Chisel, Breakfast at Sweethearts, East, Circus Animals and Twentieth Century.

Track listing
CD/ Vinyl.
 A1	"Bow River" - 4:20
 A2	"Cheap Wine" - 3:22
 A3	"Goodbye (Astrid Goodbye)" - 2:49
 A4	"No Sense" - 2:57
 A5	"Breakfast at Sweethearts" - 4:08
 A6	"Saturday Night" - 4:23
 B1	"You Got Nothing I Want" - 3:16
 B2	"My Baby" - 3:59
 B3	"Forever Now" - 4:25
 B4	"Khe Sanh" - 4:07
 B5	"Choirgirl" - 3:14
 B6	"Flame Trees" - 4:25

 Tracks A3, A5, B4 were remixed in October 1985.

Charts

References

1985 compilation albums
Compilation albums by Australian artists
Cold Chisel albums